The Wolleka Synagogue is a former synagogue of the Beta Israel in Wolleka, Ethiopia. The building is now a popular attraction for Jewish tourists.

See also
Gondar
History of the Jews in Ethiopia
List of synagogues in Ethiopia

References

Amhara Region
Beta Israel
Synagogues in Ethiopia
North Gondar Zone